Welchness is a gravel spit which forms the west extremity of Dundee Island in the Joinville Island group. It was roughly charted by the Dundee Whaling Expedition (1892–93) and named after Captain George Welch (d.1891), a leading Dundee whaler and manager, from about 1860 onward, of the Jay Whale Fishing Company, which for many years owned the Dundee Whaling Expedition ship Active.

See also
Petrel Cove

References

Spits of Antarctica
Landforms of Graham Land
Landforms of the Joinville Island group